Shawnta Darnell Rogers Jr. (born April 27, 1997) is an American college basketball player for the UMBC Retrievers of the America East Conference. Standing , he is the shortest person ever to play Division I men’s basketball.

Early life
In his childhood, Rogers lived in Baltimore, Maryland as well as in France, due to his father's basketball career. He moved to Charlotte, North Carolina at age nine, though he continued to live overseas, and did not attend an American school until he was in third grade. Rogers grew up preferring football and soccer but chose to focus on basketball in high school.

High school career
Rogers began playing varsity basketball for Indian Land High School in Indian Land, South Carolina as a seventh-grader alongside his older brother, Terrell. In his junior season, he averaged 28.2 points, 6.9 assists and 5.1 steals per game. Rogers was Indian Land's all-time leading scorer with 1,776 career points, two-time Region 4-2AA Player of the Year and led his team to its first two regional titles. As team captain, he also helped his team reach two Upper State Final Fours. After the season, Rogers drew the attention of NCAA Division I programs while playing for the CP3 All-Stars with top recruits Harry Giles and Alterique Gilbert at the Nike Elite Youth Basketball League. For his senior season, he transferred to Shiloh High School in Snellville, Georgia to play against better competition. Rogers subsequently moved to Believe Preparatory Academy in Rock Hill, South Carolina, where he averaged 23 points, seven assists and two steals per game. He recorded 18 points and five assists in a 102–56 loss to Oak Hill Academy.

Recruiting
Rogers was a consensus three-star recruit, according to major recruiting services. On October 6, 2015, he committed to play college basketball for George Washington, his father's alma mater. On May 18, 2017, Rogers switched his commitment to Florida Gulf Coast.

College career
As a freshman at Florida Gulf Coast, Rogers served as a backup point guard for Brandon Goodwin. Rogers mostly played on Florida Gulf Coast's scout team and averaged 6.4 minutes in 20 games. He scored a season-high 11 points in a 115–61 win over Webber International. After one season, Rogers transferred from the school. As a sophomore, he moved to New Mexico Junior College for more playing time and averaged 14 points and 3.7 assists per game. For his junior season, Rogers transferred to UMBC because of head coach Ryan Odom's success with undersized guards like K. J. Maura. In his debut, he registered a double-double of 14 points and 10 assists in a 134–46 victory over Valley Forge. He drew national attention during a game against LSU on November 19, 2019. Rogers scored a season-high 23 points two times. He suffered a season-ending leg injury early in the season and averaged 14 points, 4.3 assists and 3.4 rebounds per game in seven appearances. He was granted a medical redshirt. In his following season, Rogers averaged 9.8 points, before announcing that he would transfer from UMBC.

Career statistics

College

|-
| style="text-align:left;"| 2017–18
| style="text-align:left;"| Florida Gulf Coast
| 21 || 0 || 6.0 || .250 || .250 || .500 || .3 || .4 || .2 || .0 || 0.9
|-
| style="text-align:left;"| 2019–20
| style="text-align:left;"| UMBC
| 7 || 6 || 29.9 || .446 || .422 || .684 || 3.4 || 4.3 || .7 || .0 || 14.0
|-
| style="text-align:left;"| 2020–21
| style="text-align:left;"| UMBC
| 20 || 20 || 28.1 || .384 || .400 || .800 || 1.5 || 1.8 || 1.2 || .0 || 9.8
|-
| style="text-align:left;"| 2021–22
| style="text-align:left;"| UMBC
| 30 || 27 || 29.5 || .369 || .344 || .907 || 1.9 || 3.6 || 1.0 || .0 || 11.7
|- class="sortbottom"
| style="text-align:center;" colspan="2"| Career
| 78 || 53 || 22.8 || .378 || .367 || .834 || 1.5 || 2.3 || .8 || .0 || 8.5

Personal life
Rogers' father, Shawnta, was named Atlantic 10 Conference Player of the Year and won the Frances Pomeroy Naismith Award while playing college basketball for George Washington from 1995 to 1999. He is a member of the school's Athletics Hall of Fame. Shawnta later played professionally for about 10 years in Europe. Rogers' brother, Terrell, played college basketball for Delaware, among other programs. His cousin, Aquille Carr, was a high school basketball standout and played professionally.

References

External links
UMBC Retrievers bio
New Mexico JC bio
Florida Gulf Coast Eagles bio

Living people
1997 births
American men's basketball players
Basketball players from Baltimore
Florida Gulf Coast Eagles men's basketball players
NMJC Thunderbirds men's basketball players
Point guards
UMBC Retrievers men's basketball players